Sesquiterpene lactones (SLs) are a class of sesquiterpenoids that contain a lactone ring.  They are most often found in plants of the family Asteraceae (daisies, asters).  Other plant families with SLs are Umbelliferae (celery, parsley, carrots) and Magnoliaceae (magnolias). A collection of colorless, lipophilic solids, SLs are a rich source of drugs.  They can be allergenic and toxic in grazing livestock causing severe neurological problems in horses.  Some are also found in corals such as Maasella edwardsi.

Types

Sesquiterpene lactones can be divided into several main classes including germacranolides, heliangolides, guaianolides, pseudoguaianolides, hypocretenolides, and eudesmanolides.

Examples
Artemisinin, a new, highly-effective anti-malarial compound, is a sesquiterpene lactone found in Artemisia annua. Lactucin, desoxylactucin, lactucopicrin, lactucin-15-oxalate, lactucopicrin-15-oxalate are some of the most prominent found in lettuce and spinach, giving most of the bitter taste to these crops.

One eudesmanolide, 3-oxo-5αH,8βH-eudesma-1,4(15),7(11)-trien-8,12-olide, can work with vernolic acid and other compounds in plants to reduce inflammation.

Sesquiterpene lactone-containing plants
Some plants containing these compounds include:

Artichoke
Boneset Eupatorium perfoliatum
Burdock
Calea ternifolia
Chamomile
Chrysanthemum
Cocklebur
Feverfew
Gaillardia
Ginkgo biloba
Laurus nobilis
Lettuce (Lactuca)
Marsh elder
Mugwort
Parthenium
Poverty weed
Pyrethrum
Ragweed
Sagebrush
Sneezeweed
Spinach
Star anise
Sunflower
Ironweed
Wormwood
Yellow star thistle
bitter leaf
 
Quorum sensing inhibitors

Sesquiterpene lactones have been found to possess the ability to inhibit quorum sensing in bacteria.

References

External links